1999 WNBA draft

On September 15, 1998, two more players were assigned prior to the expansion draft.
On April 6, 1999, a WNBA expansion draft took place.
On May 3, 1999, another round of player allocation took place.
On May 4, 1999, the regular WNBA draft took place.
On December 15, 1999, an additional expansion draft took place for the 2000 WNBA season.  See 2000 WNBA draft for more details.

Key

Initial expansion player allocation

Expansion draft

Post-expansion draft player allocation

College draft

Round 1

Round 2

Round 3

Notes:

Round 4

References

Women's National Basketball Association Draft
Draft